Mohammad Shahiduzzaman is a Bangladesh Awami League politician and the incumbent Member of Parliament of Meherpur-2.

Early life
Shahiduzzaman was born on 15 June 1971 and has Bachelor of Laws degree.

Career
Shahiduzzaman was elected to parliament from Meherpur-2 as a Bangladesh Awami League candidate 30 December 2018.

References

Awami League politicians
Living people
1971 births
11th Jatiya Sangsad members